Michel Aurillac (11 July 1928 – 6 July 2017) was a French lawyer, politician and author. He served as a member of the National Assembly for Indre from 1978 to 1981, and in 1986. He was the Minister of Cooperation from 1986 to 1988. He won the 1987 Prix Narcisse Michaut from the Académie française.

Early life
Michel Aurillac was born on 11 July 1928. He grew up in French Indochina, where his father was a governor.

Aurillac was educated at the Lycée Albert-Sarraut in Hanoi, the Lycée Chasseloup-Laubat in Saigon, and the Collège de la Providence in Hué. He graduated from Sciences Po and the École nationale d'administration.

Career
Aurillac began his career at the Conseil d'État in 1953. He was an advisor to Abdelkader Barakrok, the Secretary of State for French Algeria, from 1957 to 1958. In 1959, Aurillac became Léopold Sédar Senghor's assistant, a year later, Senghor became the first president of Senegal, up until 1980. In 1963, Aurillac joined then-Prime Minister Georges Pompidou's cabinet as an advisor. He was subsequently Pierre Messmer's advisor and Michel Poniatowski's chief of staff. He was the Prefect of Indre in 1965, the Prefect of Essonne in 1969, and the Prefect of Picardy and Somme in 1973–1974.

Aurillac joined the Rally for the Republic, a centre-right political party. He served as a member of the National Assembly for Indre from 1978 to 1981, and in 1986. He served the Minister of Cooperation by then-Prime Minister Jacques Chirac from 1986 to 1988. He subsequently practised the law until 2001.

Aurillac was the author of several books. He won the Prix Narcisse Michaut from the Académie française for his 1987 book Le royaume oublié. He was an officer of the Legion of Honour and the National Order of Merit.

Works

Personal life and death
Aurillac was married to Martine Aurillac, who was also a politician. He died on 6 July 2017.

References

1928 births
2017 deaths
Politicians from Marseille
Rally for the Republic politicians
Government ministers of France
Deputies of the 6th National Assembly of the French Fifth Republic
Deputies of the 8th National Assembly of the French Fifth Republic
Prefects of France
Prefects of Essonne
French non-fiction writers
20th-century French lawyers
Sciences Po alumni
École nationale d'administration alumni
Officiers of the Légion d'honneur
Officers of the Ordre national du Mérite